Eugene Turenne Gregorie (also E. T. "Bob" Gregorie, Eugene T. "Bob" Gregorie; pronounced "GREG-ree"; 1908–2002) was an American yacht designer and automobile designer. Gregorie and Edsel Ford worked closely together to design many automobiles of the 1930s and 1940s. Although he was a high school dropout he became the head of Ford's automobile design department. He returned to yacht design after retirement.

Early life and family 

Gregorie was born in Hempstead, Nassau, Long Island, New York, as Eugene T. Gregorie Jr. on October 12, 1908. Gregorie's parents were Eugene Turenne Gregorie and Alva Palmer Gregorie. Gregorie was the first-born son and was nicknamed 'Bob' to distinguish him from his father.

Gregorie's ancestors came from Scotland and immigrated to Virginia in the eighteenth century. His ancestors were merchants trading in slaves and products from the United Kingdom. Gregorie's father was a successful entrepreneur with investments in the stock market. Gregorie's mother was an accomplished painter.

Education
The 1925 New York State Census shows that when Gregorie was 17 years old he was still living in Long Island, New York, with his parents. After high school, Gregorie attended private schools in Virginia for higher education. The 1940 U.S. Census shows that when he was 32 years old he resided in Grosse Ile Township, Michigan and in 1935 in Dearborn, Michigan.

Career

Yacht design 
Gregorie started his design career in 1926 at Elco Works, a New Jersey yacht-building company when he was a high school dropout.  His supervisor at the company was William Fleming, chief architect. After working there for about a year he left that firm and went to work for Cox & Stevens, a yacht designing firm in downtown Manhattan. He worked for them until the fall of 1928.

Automobile design 
Gregorie started his automobile design work at Brewster & Company, an automobile body design company, in late 1928 and worked there for about a year. He then went to Detroit and worked a few months at General Motors under the chief designer Harley Earl in the Art and Colour design department. Due to the Great Depression and the poor economy that followed, he was laid off since he was a new hire. He then tried to get a job at the Lincoln Motor Company in Detroit, but they were not hiring at the time. Gregorie obtained various odd jobs related to yachts for much of 1930. He spent the winter of 1930 with his family in a South Carolina cottage.

Gregorie received a telegram at the end of December 1930 from Lincoln Motor Company's chief body engineer saying they needed an automobile body designer; the directive came from Edsel Ford who was in charge of Lincoln Motor Company. The telegram read Report at Ford Motor Company Engineering Laboratory, Dearborn. Confident he could do automotive design quite well, Gregorie traveled to Dearborn, Michigan, which took him several days. Edsel Ford hired him in early 1931 at age twenty-two. His first assignment was to design a Ford automobile for the European market, which became the Model Y.

Gregorie's personality harmonized with Edsel Ford (son of Henry Ford), and their close relationship combined with his own professional skills in automotive design led to him becoming the head of Ford's design department in 1935. Gregorie was a designer of the 1936 Lincoln-Zephyr, which had a design concept based on the 1934 Pioneer Zephyr streamliner train, also referred to as the Burlington Zephyr. The 1936 Lincoln-Zephyr car was called "the first successfully streamlined car in America" by the Museum of Modern Art in New York. Gregorie was ultimately given the accolade of being the "grand old man" of Ford car design.

In 1938 Edsel Ford wanted a "special little sports car" for pleasure driving at his estate in Florida for the winter of 1939. Gregorie is known to have told biographers that in September 1938 it took him less than an hour to sketch the first Lincoln Continental using as a template the 1936 Lincoln-Zephyr blueprints.

As Jim Farrell, a writer about Ford design history, summarized: "Gregorie's primary attribute was he could translate what Edsel Ford wanted into three-dimensional designs. ... He could sit and sketch while Edsel talked in his office."

The Ford engineers were amazed that Gregorie could talk about the mechanical abilities of an automobile as well as he could design a car. Gregorie attributed this ability to his naval architecture experience.

Highlights of his career at Ford included: the Lincoln-Zephyr blueprint for a two-door cabriolet; the first Mercury, the 1940 and 1941 Fords; a killed-in-the-womb "small" post-war Ford; and a concept 1939 Lincoln Continental; and a concept for the 1949 Ford (which was won by George W. Walker, who had been hired by "Whiz Kid" Ernest Breech.

Retirement and death 
Gregorie retired from Ford Motor Company in 1946 when he was only 38 years old, mainly because he did not get along with the new management after Edsel Ford died in 1943. Gregorie designed a Mercury prior to Edsel's death  the last car approved by Edsel  which was produced as the 1949 Mercury.

Gregorie retired to St. Augustine, Florida, after leaving Ford Motor Company. There he resumed designing yachts. He died December 1, 2002. His wife Evelyn outlived him.

See also 
 Chrysler Airflow 
 Chrysler Airstream

References

Sources

Further reading

External links 
 ConCeptcarz information on Gregorie
 ConCeptcarz additional on Gregorie
 ConCeptcarz additional on Gregorie as "Bob"
 Feature Article from Hemmings Classic Car – biography on E.T. Gregorie, (November, 2007) – Jim Donnelly

1908 births
2002 deaths
American automotive engineers
General Motors designers
American automobile designers
Ford executives
People in the automobile industry
Businesspeople from Michigan